Jeremiah Bitsui (born ) is an American actor, best known for his portrayal of Victor in the AMC series Breaking Bad and Better Call Saul.

Early and personal life
Bitsui was born in Chinle, Arizona. He is of Navajo and Omaha descent, and lived on the Navajo Nation Native American reservation until the age of ten. He later moved to Albuquerque, New Mexico, where he graduated from Albuquerque High School. 

Bitsui has a daughter named Olivia. He is the co-founder of Youth Impacting Youth, a mentorship program which connects college students with youth who have experienced domestic violence.

Career 
Bitsui started his career at the age of five as Mickey in the Japanese film Mickey's House. He appeared in the 1994 film Natural Born Killers and the 2005 film A Thousand Roads, which was an official Sundance Film Festival selection. He is also known for his portrayal of Eagle Flies in the 2018 video game Red Dead Redemption 2, and the television series Bosch and Yellowstone.

Filmography

Film

Television

Video games

References

External links
 

Native American male actors
Living people
Omaha (Native American) people
Navajo people
Year of birth missing (living people)